In Greek mythology, Mentes (Ancient Greek: Μέντης) was the king of the Cicones.

Mythology 
In Book XVII of the Iliad, Apollo disguises himself as Mentes to encourage Hector to fight Menelaus, ("Hector, now you're going after something you'll not catch, chasing the horses of warrior Achilles, descendant of Aeacus. No mortal man, except Achilles, can control or drive them, for an immortal mother gave him birth. Meanwhile, warrior Menelaus, Atreus' son, standing by Patroclus, has just killed the best man of the Trojans, Euphorbus, son of Panthous, ending his brave fight.")

Note

References 

 Homer, The Iliad with an English Translation by A.T. Murray, Ph.D. in two volumes. Cambridge, MA., Harvard University Press; London, William Heinemann, Ltd. 1924. . Online version at the Perseus Digital Library.
 Homer, Homeri Opera in five volumes. Oxford, Oxford University Press. 1920. . Greek text available at the Perseus Digital Library.

Mythological kings of Thrace
Kings in Greek mythology
People of the Trojan War
Greek mythology of Thrace